MidSTAR, a project of the United States Naval Academy (USNA) Small Satellite Program (SSP), is a general-purpose satellite bus capable of supporting a variety of space missions by easily accommodating a wide range of space experiments and instruments.

Mission architecture
The baseline MidSTAR mission includes a single spacecraft under the command and control of a single satellite ground (SGS) station located at USNA, Annapolis MD. (Lat. 38.98 N, 76.49 W). The ground station forwards downlinked data files to the Principal Investigators via the Internet. Secondary ground control will be available on an as-needed/space-available basis through Naval Postgraduate School (NPS), Monterey CA (36.6 N, 121.89 W). Launch segment for MidSTAR is either the Delta IV or Atlas V EELV. The orbit is tailored to payload requirements; where no requirements exist, the orbit of the primary payload or one of the other secondary payloads is accepted. In order for the spacecraft to be seen from USNA SGS at an elevation greater than 30 degrees and range simultaneously less than 900 km, the must be 500 ± 200 km with inclination greater than 35 degrees.

Satellites 
 MidSTAR I
 MidSTAR II, canceled

See also
 United States Naval Academy

References

Satellite Internet access
United States Naval Academy